General  Sir Patrick Nicholas Yardley Monrad Sanders,  (born 6 April 1966) is a senior British Army officer serving as Chief of the General Staff since June 2022.

Early life and education
Sanders was born on 6 April 1966 in Tidworth, Wiltshire, England. He was educated at Worth School, then an all-boys private boarding school attached to the Benedictine Worth Abbey. He studied at the University of Exeter, and Cranfield University.

Military career
Sanders was commissioned into the Royal Green Jackets on 23 September 1984. He served as a junior officer in Northern Ireland during the Troubles and then undertook tours in Kosovo in 1999 and in Bosnia and Herzegovina in 2001. He became Chief of Staff of 1st Mechanised Brigade in 2002 and then became commanding officer of 2nd Battalion the Royal Green Jackets in 2005. In the latter role he managed the transition of his battalion to become 4th Battalion The Rifles and then saw action with his battalion at the siege of UK bases in Basra in 2007 during the Iraq War. On 25 July 2008, he was awarded the Distinguished Service Order (DSO) "in recognition of gallant and distinguished services in Iraq during the period 1st October 2007 to 31st March 2008".

Sanders became commander of 20th Armoured Brigade in August 2009, in which role he was deployed to command Task Force Helmand in Afghanistan in October 2011. On 28 September 2012, he was appointed a Commander of the Order of the British Empire (CBE) "in recognition of gallant and distinguished services in Afghanistan during the period 1 October 2011 to 31 March 2012". He served as Chief of the Defence Staff's Liaison Officer to the United States Joint Chiefs of Staff in 2012 and Assistant Chief of the Defence Staff (Operations) in March 2013. In 2014, he took part in the Prime Minister's Cobra meetings on the floods crisis.

General officer
Sanders took over command of the 3rd (United Kingdom) Division in April 2015. In December 2016, he was appointed Commander Field Army and promoted to lieutenant general. Sanders was appointed Colonel Commandant and President of the Honourable Artillery Company on 31 January 2019, in succession to General Sir Richard Barrons. Sanders was promoted to full general on 6 May 2019 and appointed as Commander Joint Forces Command. Joint Forces Command was renamed as Strategic Command on 9 December 2019.

Sanders was appointed a Knight Commander of the Order of the Bath (KCB) in the 2020 New Year Honours. He was the preferred candidate of the Ministry of Defence to succeed General Sir Nick Carter as Chief of the Defence Staff in 2021, due to his expertise in cyber capability, but Prime Minister Boris Johnson picked Admiral Sir Tony Radakin instead.

Following an announcement in February 2022, Sanders became Chief of the General Staff in June 2022.

On 7 June 2022, Sanders took the decision to cancel an overseas deployment by 3rd Battalion, Parachute Regiment, after a number of incidents which demonstrated a poor standard of discipline in the battalion. The minister, James Heappey, was said to be "sorry and embarrassed" by the "disgraceful" behaviour.

On 16 June 2022, Sanders told British soldiers they are the generation that must prepare "to fight in Europe once again" as the conflict in Ukraine continues. He wrote how "There is now a burning imperative to forge an Army capable of fighting alongside our allies and defeating Russia in battle."

References

|-

|-
 

 
|-
	
	

|-
	
	

1966 births
Alumni of Cranfield University
Alumni of the University of Exeter
British Army generals
British Army personnel of the Iraq War
British Army personnel of the War in Afghanistan (2001–2021)
Knights Commander of the Order of the Bath
Companions of the Distinguished Service Order
Commanders of the Order of the British Empire
Living people
Military personnel from Wiltshire
People educated at Worth School